Christiane Christiansdatter Sehested (15 July 1626 – 1670) was the daughter of king Christian IV of Denmark and his morganatic spouse, Kirsten Munk. She shared the title Countess of Schleswig-Holstein with her mother and siblings. She was the twin of her sister Hedevig Ulfeldt.

She was raised under the supervision of the royal governess Karen Sehested. Christiane was engaged by her father with the noble Hannibal Sehested, viceroy of Norway, in 1636. She was married under great festivities in Copenhagen in 1642. She left for Norway with her spouse and lived with him in Akershus fortress in Oslo. Her father died in 1648. In 1651, her husband lost his position, and she was called to Copenhagen to sign a statement in which her spouse was deprived of his Norwegian estates. She also lost her status as countess. Her relationship with Sehested, and her siblings was not close, and in 1651–58, she lived alone in poverty in Hamburg. She returned to Denmark in 1658 to side with the invading Swedes with her spouse to avenge the loss of her status; they joined the Swedish camp outside the sieged Danish capital. In 1660, Sehested regained the trust of the court, and in 1662, she was given back her personal status as countess. In 1666, she was widowed and retired to her estates.

She is known to have written several folk songs.

Ancestry

References 
 Dansk biografisk Lexikon / III. Bind. Brandt - Clavus /  (in Danish)

1626 births
1670 deaths
17th-century Danish nobility
17th-century Norwegian nobility
17th-century Danish women writers
Danish twins
17th-century Danish landowners
Children of Christian IV of Denmark
Daughters of kings